Arcadia is a pastoral poem written around 1480 by Jacopo Sannazaro and published in 1504 in Naples. Sannazaro's Arcadia influenced the literature of the 16th and 17th centuries (e.g., William Shakespeare, Philip Sidney, Marguerite de Navarre, Jorge de Montemayor, Garcilaso de la Vega and John Milton).

Form 
Arcadia by Sannazaro could be considered a prosimetrum – a combination of prose and verse. The alternation of prose and verse is consistent, but each varies considerably. Many portions of the prose are merely descriptive. Others sections, especially in the second half of the poem, are more narrative. Like the prose, the poetry is varied with a number of different poetical forms, including frottola, barzelletta, madrigal, and canzona. 
Because of the pastoral subject and the sections in prose, Arcadia could also be considered an example of the Pastoral novel genre. Sannazaro can be considered the founder of this literary genre, another well known example is L'Astrée by Honoré d'Urfé.

Publication history 
The publication history of Arcadia has two phases. The first follows the tradition of manuscripts consisting of an introduction ("proemio") and ten units in prose and verse. Initially this literary collection was called Aeglogarum liber Arcadium inscriptus then Sannazaro decided to change the name to Libro pastorale nominato (intitulato) Arcadio.

Some years later Sannazaro modified the whole Arcadia again. The title became simply Arcadia and now consisted of a dedication, an introduction, twelve units of prose and verse, and an epilogue (A la Zampogna – To the bagpipes).
Three eclogues (I, II and VI) were probably composed before Sannazaro planned to write Arcadia.
They were modified and added to the Pastoral Novel. The first version of Arcadia with introduction and the ten units of prose and verse was completed towards the end of 1484. A flawed version was published in Venice in 1501 without the approval of the author.  The same edition was reprinted by Bernardino da Vercelli in 1502.
The second edition was completed by Sannazaro around 1495. This last version was published by Pietro Summonte, who was a humanist and member of the Accademia Pontaniana, in Naples in 1504.

Style 
The early fame of Arcadia in Italy was due to its linguistic merits.
What made this literary work so original was Sannazaro's decision to write in the Italian language instead of in a regional dialect or in Latin, which was extremely popular in the 15th and 16th centuries. Its style created a completely artificial literary idiom, unspoken by either Florentines or Neapolitans.
The language used in Arcadia seems to blend Giovanni Boccaccio's prose and Petrarch's poetry.

Reception 
When Arcadia was printed in the 16th century, it became a bestseller.
In Italy alone more than 66 editions were printed. Inspired in part by classical authors who described the pastoral world (Virgil, Theocritus, Ovid, Tibullus), and in part by Giovanni Boccaccio's Ameto, Sannazaro wrote a literary work that can be considered the first production of the European Renaissance.

Later audiences grew impatient and hostile. Modern readers tend to consider the text confused and frustrating. But towards the end of the 17th century, the Academy, founded in Rome, was named after the Pastoral novel.

See also 
 Jacopo Sannazaro

References

External links 
 Arcadia Venetia 1524 from Bayerische StaatsBibliothek
 Arcadia web(PDF; 350 kB). Laterza, Bari 196
 Ekphrasis and the Feminine in Sannazaro's Arcadia

1504 books
15th-century poems
Renaissance literature